In video games, and especially in online multiplayer games, to rank up (sometimes abbreviated r^ in text chats) is to achieve a higher ranking relative to other players. Ranking up may refer both to this and the techniques used to do so, while a rank-up game, rank-up match or rank-up room is a match expressly set up for this purpose.

The term "ranking up" usually implies a direct approach. Gamers who rank up may exploit known game glitches, play with special strategies, or play only in specific matches or against certain other players, to improve their ranks without using or improving their own skill or expertise in the game in general. In this case, it is often considered a form of cheating.

To rank up, players must reach a certain goal. Depending on the type of game, characters can rank up by gaining experience points, performing tasks, or reaching a certain number of kills.

The PlayStation 2 series SOCOM is one set of games where ranking up techniques are used by some players, to improve their rank on the games' official online leaderboards.

Single player games
In single player games, often a ranking system is also present. High rankings will most likely lead to better rewards or can even unlock features or extra levels. Sometimes, a certain ranking must be achieved in order to succeed a level, or proceed to the next. Most often, ranking up will present players with a new feature, item, trait, or weapon which can give them an advantage over lower level players or AI.

In Tenchu, one can achieve a higher ranking by performing more (stealth) kills, by not killing civilians and by remaining unseen. Rankings include "Grand Master", "Expert", and "Rookie".

In Hitman, one can achieve a higher ranking by performing "as little kills as possible", in contrast to Tenchu, by not using any firearms, by remaining undetected and by not alerting guards of a possible intruder (that being you). The best possible ranking is "silent assassin" (maximum stealth and minimum aggression). Two other extremes are "mass murderer" (minimum stealth and maximum aggression) and "sociopath" (maximum stealth and maximum aggression, best achieved in the "Traditions of the Trade" mission of Hitman: Contracts).

In the Devil May Cry and Ace Combat series, a grading system using letters are used. In Devil May Cry, the rating goes from SSS to D, with SSS being the highest and D the lowest and with each letter being assigned a single word to represent its value (e.g. in Devil May Cry 3, A stands for "awesome"). In Ace Combat the rating goes from S to C with S being the best and C the worst.

In Grand Theft Auto: San Andreas, an overall ranking (which can be viewed in the stats menu) will give the player a ranking (which carry names given to individuals within the criminal underworld such as "King of San Andreas", "Burglar" and "Pickpocket") depending on his or her score. This score is influenced by gang members and dealers killed, territories lost or gained, game progress (completing all missions, odd jobs, races and the like will reward the player with a grand 100%), various RPG-style stats including respect and appeal and more.

External links
"SOCOM II Questions", a forum thread on GameSpot, mentioning the term (and the apparent randomness of the SOCOM II ranking system).

Video game gameplay
Esports terminology